Filipstads IF is a sports club in Filipstad, Sweden, established in 1930. The men's bandy team played in the Swedish top division during the seasons of 1967–1968, 1972–1973 and 1974–1975. The soccer team played in the Swedish fourth division during the season of 1956/1957.

References

External links
Bandy
Ice hockey
Track and field athletics

1930 establishments in Sweden
Athletics clubs in Sweden
Bandy clubs in Sweden
Defunct football clubs in Sweden
Ice hockey teams in Sweden
Ice hockey teams in Värmland County
Bandy clubs established in 1930
Ice hockey clubs established in 1930